Saltator is a genus of passerine birds in the tanager family Thraupidae that are found in Central and South America. They have thick bills, relatively long tails and strong legs and feet.
Before the introduction of molecular genetic methods in the 21st century these species were placed in the cardinal family Cardinalidae.

Taxonomy
The genus was introduced by the French ornithologist Louis Pierre Vieillot in 1816 with the buff-throated saltator as the type species. The name is from the Latin saltator, saltatoris meaning "dancer".

The saltators were traditionally grouped with the cardinals, either in the subfamily Cardinalinae within an expanded Emberizidae or in a separate family Cardinalidae. Molecular phylogenetic studies have shown that the saltators are embedded within the tanager family Thraupidae. Within the Thraupidae the genus Saltator is now placed with the genus Saltatricula in the subfamily Saltatorinae. The relationship of the subfamily to the other subfamilies within the Thraupidae is uncertain.

Species 
The genus contains 16 species:

The rufous-bellied mountain saltator was formerly a member of this genus. It is now placed in the subfamily Thraupinae and is the only member of the genus Pseudosaltator. Its common name has been changed to rufous-bellied mountain tanager. The black-throated saltator was also formerly assigned to this genus. It is now placed together with the many-colored Chaco finch in the genus Saltatricula as the two species form a divergent clade that is sister to the other members of Saltator.

References

Further reading

External links 

 Saltator videos, photos & sounds on the Internet Bird Collection

 
Bird genera
Taxa named by Louis Jean Pierre Vieillot